Badawi "Buddy" Farah (born 18 August 1978) is a football agent and former footballer. Born in Australia, Farah is of Lebanese descent.

After beginning his career with Marconi Stallions in the Australian National Soccer League, he went on to play for Nejmeh in the Lebanese Premier League and Keflavík in the Iceland Úrvalsdeild, before retiring in 2008. Farah represented the Australia U23 national team prior to the 2000 Sydney Olympics, and the Lebanon senior national team from 2000 to 2004.

Club career

Early career
Farah played youth football for Australian National Soccer League club Marconi Stallions where he joined the club's first-team in 1997. In 2001, he was transferred to fellow NSL side Wollongong Wolves where he would stay until 2003. At the end of the 2002–2003 season Wollongong had offered to renew Farah's contract, however, it was declined due to the low wage which was worth one-third of his previous contract. Farah played for Nepean Association in the 2003 NSW State League Division 1, scoring two goals in seven appearances.

Nejmeh
On 28 August 2003, Farah signed a two-year contract with Lebanese Premier League club Nejmeh; the contract was worth at least six times what he would have been receiving if he had stayed at Wollongong; the contract was worth an estimated $220,000 (€170,000). Farah was the first Christian to be signed by the Muslim club, where he had established himself in the club's first-team while playing for Lebanon. Saudi Arabia's Al-Hilal offered a fee of $1million (€770,000) to pry him away from Nejmeh, but the club president, Rafic Hariri, who at the time was Lebanon's Prime Minister, declined the offer. While at the club, Nejmeh reached the quarter-finals of the 2004 AFC Cup and played in the qualifying rounds of the 2004 AFC Champions League. In 2004 Farah sued Nejmeh over a pay dispute and alleged breach of contract. The club neglected Farah while he suffered a serious liver infection, which evolved into a near-death experience. Farah had been sent to hospital in early 2004, having been diagnosed with Hepatitis A, after eating contaminated seafood. He was treated in enough time to escape liver surgery. He then left Beirut for further treatment in Sydney, on the condition he'd return to Nejmeh after an agreed six-week period. During that time, Farah claimed that Nejmeh did not honour its financial commitments, as Farah refused to return to Lebanon due to the financial issue. Farah then pressed legal charges to Nejmeh's board of directions where his legal team were arguing that Farah had been robbed of income from representing Lebanon; the case's resolution was in the hands of a court in Lebanon.

Return to Australia
After returning from Lebanon to Australia in 2004 where he joined Marconi Stallions, he was ineligible to play for six months due to a dis-clearance from FIFA. Farah joined Bankstown City Lions before transferring to Malaysian side Selangor FA. He then signed a two-year contract with Iceland's Keflavík ÍF, where the club had finished fourth in the Iceland Úrvalsdeild. Farah joined A.P.I.A. Leichhardt Tigers for the 2007 New South Wales Premier League season before retiring in 2008.

International career

Australia U23
Under coach Raul Blanco, Farah had featured in 10 games for the Australian Under-23 squad prior to the 2000 Sydney Olympics. Blanco selected his squad for the tournament leaving out Farah. Farah saw that his chance of fame had been gone due to the selection.

Lebanon
In 2000, Farah took up the opportunity to represent Lebanon, becoming the second Australian born player to do so after Michael Reda in 2000, where he would take part in the qualifying campaign for the 2002 FIFA World Cup and the 2002 Arab Nations Cup. Farah's moment of glory came on 4 September 2003 when he scored in the 56th minute of a 1–0 victory against North Korea in Pyongyang during a 2004 AFC Asian Cup qualification match.

<blockquote>
"I was always passionate about playing for Australia, but when the time came he (Blanco) always picked someone else," "It was a bit disappointing, but I guess it wasn't to be. Now I'm playing for Lebanon, I basically get picked for every game, and I'm playing for a club side which gets 40,000 to 50,000 people every game. It's been an incredible ride, I haven't had time to scratch myself. It was huge, scoring my first international goal," What made it even better was the way we had been treated before the game. They put us in a dump of a hotel, we had to cook our own food for a week, and our training field had goats and sheep on it. The experience bonded us together, and when we went out and beat them, well, let's just say we enjoyed it." – Farah on playing for Lebanon</blockquote>

He would take part in the qualifying campaign for the 2006 FIFA World Cup before retiring from international football in 2004. In January 2006, Lebanon and Australia were both drawn in the same group for the 2007 AFC Asian Cup qualifiers. Within hours from the draw's finalisation, Farah had contacted the Lebanese FA and was told that he would be "welcomed back with open arms". The draw of Australia and Lebanon made Farah contemplate returning to an overseas club to increase his chances of playing international football.

Personal life
Since 2009, Farah is managing director of Benchmark Sports Management, and acts as an advisor for a number of Australian and international professional footballers and clubs.

Career statistics

InternationalScores and results list Lebanon's goal tally first.''

See also
 List of Lebanon international footballers born outside Lebanon

References

External links
 
 

1978 births
Living people
Soccer players from Sydney
Lebanese footballers
Australian soccer players
Australian people of Lebanese descent
Sportspeople of Lebanese descent
Australian Christians
Lebanese Christians
Association football midfielders
National Soccer League (Australia) players
Marconi Stallions FC players
Wollongong Wolves FC players
Lebanese Premier League players
Nejmeh SC players
Lebanese expatriate footballers
Australian expatriate soccer players
Expatriate footballers in Malaysia
Lebanese expatriate sportspeople in Malaysia
Australian expatriate sportspeople in Malaysia
Selangor FA players
Expatriate footballers in Iceland
Lebanese expatriate sportspeople in Iceland
Australian expatriate sportspeople in Iceland
Úrvalsdeild karla (football) players
Knattspyrnudeild Keflavík players
Lebanon international footballers